is a Japanese football player. He plays for Tokyo United FC.

Career
Daiki Kawato joined J3 League club SC Sagamihara in 2017.

Club statistics
Updated to 22 February 2020.

References

External links

1994 births
Living people
Nippon Sport Science University alumni
Association football people from Hyōgo Prefecture
Japanese footballers
J3 League players
SC Sagamihara players
Tokyo United FC players
Association football midfielders